Louis Rosenberg (July 5, 1898 – July 2, 1999) was a United States district judge of the United States District Court for the Western District of Pennsylvania.

Education and career

Born in Beaver Falls, Pennsylvania, Rosenberg received a Bachelor of Laws from Duquesne University School of Law in 1923. He was special counsel for Allegheny County Emergency Relief in 1935. He was special deputy attorney general of the Commonwealth of Pennsylvania from 1936 to 1939. He was special counsel for the Commonwealth of Pennsylvania from 1939 to 1941. He was special assistant city solicitor for the City of Pittsburgh from 1941 to 1956. He was Director of Public Safety for Pittsburgh from 1956 to 1961.

Federal judicial service

Rosenberg received a recess appointment from President John F. Kennedy on November 20, 1961, to the United States District Court for the Western District of Pennsylvania, to a new seat created by 75 Stat. 80. He was nominated to the same seat by President Kennedy on January 15, 1962. He was confirmed by the United States Senate on July 10, 1962, and received his commission on July 12, 1962. He assumed senior status on January 5, 1976. His service was terminated on July 2, 1999, due to his death in Highland Park, Pennsylvania.

See also
List of Jewish American jurists

References

Sources
 

1898 births
1999 deaths
American centenarians
Men centenarians
Judges of the United States District Court for the Western District of Pennsylvania
United States district court judges appointed by John F. Kennedy
20th-century American judges
People from Beaver Falls, Pennsylvania